Louis L. Ward (1920 in Lenora, Kansas – February 10, 1996 in Kansas City, Missouri) was an American businessman who successfully turned the Russell Stover Candies company into an international brand after purchasing the company in 1960. In 1941 he earned a bachelor's degree in chemical engineering from Stanford University.

References

1920 births
1996 deaths
20th-century American businesspeople
Stanford University alumni